Krystal Thomas (born June 10, 1989) is a former American professional basketball player in the Women's National Basketball Association (WNBA).

USA Basketball
Thomas was selected as a member of the USA Women's U19 team which won the gold medal at the FIBA U19 World Championship in Bratislava, Slovakia. The event was held in July and August 2007, when the USA team defeated Sweden to win the championship. She averaged 7.8 points per game.

Duke  statistics
Source

Professional career

WNBA
Thomas was selected in the third round of the 2011 WNBA Draft (36th overall) by the Seattle Storm. After 7 games played with the Storm, she was waived and then signed with the Phoenix Mercury.

In her second season with the Mercury, she averaged career-highs in scoring and rebounding and set franchise records for most consecutive double-digit rebound games and most offensive rebounds in a season.

In 2014, Thomas was waived by the Mercury and then signed with the Indiana Fever.

After becoming a free agent in 2015, she opted to sit out the entire season and took an assistant coach job offer from  Grand Canyon University.

In 2016, Thomas signed a training camp contract with the Storm but was waived before the start of the season. Eventually the Storm would re-acquire Thomas one month into the 2016 season.

In February 2017, Thomas signed with the Washington Mystics. During the 2017 season, Thomas would have the best season of her career. After the first four games of the season, Thomas was moved from the bench to starting center in the Mystics lineup. On August 4, 2017, Thomas scored 3 points and grabbed a career-high 20 rebounds in a 76–74 loss to the San Antonio Stars. On August 12, 2017, Thomas scored a career-high 20 points along with 14 rebounds in a 100–80 win over the Indiana Fever. By the end of the season, Thomas would average new career-highs in scoring, rebounding, steals, assists and blocks. Following the league's new playoff format from the previous season, the Mystics would finish as the 6th seed in the league with an 18–16 record. In the first round elimination game, the Mystics defeated the Dallas Wings 86–76. Thomas scored 5 points along with 17 rebounds in the win. In the second round elimination game, the Mystics defeated the number-3 seeded New York Liberty 82–68, advancing past the second round for the first time in franchise history. Thomas scored 11 points along with 6 rebounds in the win. In the semi-finals, the Mystics would be defeated by the Minnesota Lynx in a 3-game sweep.

In 2018, Thomas would have reduced role on the team. Her reduced role would help for the betterment of the team as the Mystics finished 22–12 with the number 3 seed, receiving a bye to the second round. In the second round elimination game, the Mystics defeated the Los Angeles Sparks 96–64 to advance to the semi-finals again. In the semi-finals, they would defeat the number 2 seeded Atlanta Dream in five games to advance to the WNBA Finals for the first time in franchise history. In the Finals, the Mystics would fall short as they were swept by the Seattle Storm.

Overseas
In the 2011-12 WNBA off-season, Thomas played in France for Union Lyon Basket Feminin. In the 2012-13 WNBA off-season, Thomas played in China for the Jiangsu Phonenix. In the 2013-14 WNBA off-season, Thomas played in Spain for Perfumerias Avenida and won a championship with the team. In 2017, Thomas signed with Mersin BBSK for the 2017-18 WNBA off-season.

WNBA career statistics

WNBA regular season

|-
| style="text-align:left;"| *
| style="text-align:left;"| Seattle
| 7 || 0 || 3.1 || 1.000 || .000 || .000 || 0.6 || 0.1 || 0.3 || 0.3 || 0.3
|-
| style="text-align:left;"| *
| style="text-align:left;"| Phoenix
| 8 || 0 || 12.3 || .563 || .000 || .500 || 1.0 || 0.1 || 0.0 || 0.6  || 2.6
|-
| style="text-align:left;"| 
| style="text-align:left;"| Total
| 15 ||0 || 8.0 || .588 || .000 || .500 || 0.8 || 0.1 || 0.1 || 0.5 || 1.5
|-
| style="text-align:left;"| 
| style="text-align:left;"| Phoenix
| 29 || 25 || 26.6 || .484 || .000 || .500  || 8.0 || 0.9 || 0.1 || 0.9 || 6.4
|-
| style="text-align:left;"| 
| style="text-align:left;"| Phoenix
| 34 || 3 || 14.0 || .516 || .000 || .419 || 4.1 || 0.2 || 0.2 || 0.5 || 2.3
|-
| style="text-align:left;"| 
| style="text-align:left;"| Indiana
| 21 || 3 || 8.4 || .545 || .000 || .429 || 2.2 || 0.4 || 0.1 || 0.7 || 2.0
|-
| style="text-align:left;"| 
| style="text-align:left;"| Seattle
| 19 || 0 || 9.3 || .579 || .000 || .714 || 2.3 || 0.1 || 0.2 || 0.6 || 1.4
|-
| style="text-align:left;"| 
| style="text-align:left;"| Washington
| 34 || 30 || 24.3 || .544  || .000 || .603 || 9.6 || 1.0 || 0.5 || 1.1 || 7.0
|-
| style="text-align:left;"| 
| style="text-align:left;"| Washington
| 24|| 7 || 9.9 || .429 || .000 || .636 || 2.5 || 0.2 || 0.1 || 0.0 || 1.8
|- class="sortbottom"
| style="text-align:center;" colspan="2" | Career
| 176 || 68 || 16.2 || .516 || .000 || .532 || 4.9 || 0.5 || 0.3 || 0.6 || 3.6

WNBA postseason

|-
|style="text-align:left;"|2011
|style="text-align:left;"|Phoenix
||4||0||5.0||.333||.000||1.000||2.0||0.3||0.2||0.0||1.0
|-
|style="text-align:left;"|2013
|style="text-align:left;"|Phoenix
||5||0||7.9||.667||.000||.500||2.2||0.0||0.0||0.2||1.0
|-
|style="text-align:left;"|2014
|style="text-align:left;"|Indiana
||2||0||5.8||.500||.000||.000||1.5||0.0||0.0||0.0||1.0
|-
|style="text-align:left;"|2017
| style="text-align:left;"| Washington
| 5 || 5|| 26.7 || .579 || .000 || .500 || 8.2 || 1.2 || 0.2 || 1.4 || 5.6
|-
|style="text-align:left;"|2018
| style="text-align:left;"| Washington
| 3 || 0 || 2.4 || .000 || .000 || .000 || 1.3 || 0.3 || 0.0 || 0.0 || 0.0
|- class="sortbottom"
| style="text-align:center;" colspan="2" | Career
| 19 || 5 || 11.1 || .517 || .000 || .529 || 3.5 || 0.4 || 0.1 || 0.4 || 2.1
|}

Personal life
Thomas is the oldest of five siblings. She has a sister that plays professional volleyball overseas. While at Duke University, Thomas majored in psychology. Other than professional basketball, Thomas is also an assistant coach at Grand Canyon University in her spare time.

References

1989 births
Living people
American expatriate basketball people in China
American expatriate basketball people in Spain
American women's basketball players
Basketball players from Orlando, Florida
Duke Blue Devils women's basketball players
Indiana Fever players
Jiangsu Phoenix players
Phoenix Mercury players
Seattle Storm draft picks
Seattle Storm players
Washington Mystics players
Centers (basketball)